The Subprefecture of Guaianases is one of 32 subprefectures of the city of São Paulo, Brazil.  It comprises two districts: Guaianases and Lajeado.

References

Subprefectures of São Paulo